Mahabad Agricultural Training Camp ( – Markazāmūzseh-ye Keshāvarzī-ye Mahābād va Pādegān) is a village in Mokriyan-e Shomali Rural District, in the Central District of Miandoab County, West Azerbaijan Province, Iran. At the 2006 census, its population was 136, in 40 families.

References 

Populated places in Miandoab County